Jefferson County High School (JCHS) is a public high school located in Louisville, Georgia, United States. The school is part of the Jefferson County School District, which serves Jefferson County.

History

Establishment

In 1995 the two public high schools of Jefferson County, an administrative area including approximately 17,000 residents, were closed and consolidated into a single new entity, Jefferson County High School. At the time of the new school's construction in Louisville, more than half of the county's residents did not have a high school education, and 70 percent of its high school graduates did not seek a college education.

The Jefferson County School District named Molly Howard as principal of the new school at the time of its formation. She and the school's staff set about improving the educational performance of the student body, posting impressive gains in achievement in state-mandated mathematics tests during the first decade of the 21st century, which led to Howard being selected as the 2008 National High School Principal of the Year by the National Association of Secondary School Principals.

Demographics

Jefferson County High School has slightly more than 1,000 students, of whom 79% are of non-European American ethnicity. About four out of five Jefferson County High School students are from families with income levels low enough to qualify for price-subsidized lunches.

References

External links 
 Jefferson County High School
 Jefferson County School District

Schools in Jefferson County, Georgia
Public high schools in Georgia (U.S. state)
Schools accredited by the Southern Association of Colleges and Schools